The Allison T40, company designation Allison Model 500, was an early American turboprop engine composed of two Allison T38 power sections driving a contra-rotating propeller via a common gearbox.

Design and development

The T40 concept originated at Allison in 1944, where design studies were carried out on a  turboprop engine. Taking advantage of this effort, the US Navy awarded Allison a contract for the design and development of a  turboprop engine. The resulting T40 combined two Allison T38-A-1 power sections side-by-side with a common reduction gearbox powering contra-rotating propellers. Similar in layout to the Armstrong Siddeley Double Mamba, the T40 differed in that each engine drove both the forward and the rear propellers, unlike the Double Mamba, where each Mamba power section drove either the front or the rear propeller separately.

The T38-A-1 power sections each contained 17-stage compressors giving a pressure ratio of 6.3:1, eight combustion chambers, and four-stage turbines. A combining reduction gearbox was driven via extension shafts from the power sections. Each transmission shaft incorporated a clutch to allow the power sections to be run independently.

Accessories included a Master Control Unit, mounted above the compressors, and an air driven starter on the gearbox. The compound reduction gear had an overall reduction ratio of 15.75:1 and incorporated an airscrew brake to prevent windmilling when the engine was stopped. Anti-icing for the air intakes was supplied by compressor bleed air. The contra-rotating propeller consisted of two  three-bladed Aeroproducts propellers fitted to concentric shafts.

Testing of the XT40 began on 4 June 1948. There was a vibration problem in the reduction gearbox due to the coincidence of tooth-meshing frequencies which required a redesign. The de-coupling system, designed to disconnect a power section in the event of failure worked successfully. During a run in a test cell one power section developed a major oil leak and an attempt to shut it down failed because the engine carried on running on the leaking oil. After many attempts to shut it down the offending power section could only be shut down by destroying the compressor with debris thrown down the intake, proving the de-coupling system.

First flight test of the T40 was in the Convair XP5Y flying boat on 18 April 1950 fitted with four T40-A-4 developing . Service use of the T40 revealed problems with integrity of the propellers and gearboxes with at least one instance each of a propeller breaking free and a gearbox separation. One unusual problem was discovered during ground running of the Republic XF-84H Thunderscreech turboprop powered fighter; the special transonic 3-bladed single propeller set up harmonics that proved to be harmful to humans within a certain distance from the aircraft.

The major problems of the T40 included gearbox failures, and the propeller control system which used 25 vacuum tubes, and was far from reliable. As the individual power plants were clutched into the gearbox, it was intended in most instances that the aircraft could cruise on one half of the engine and only engage the second power-section when there was need. In practice the system did not work well. Failure to recognize that one of the T38s had failed, and its compressor was devouring power produced by the other section, led to the loss of the first prototype Douglas XA2D-1 and its pilot on 14 December 1950.

Operational history

The first aircraft to fly with the T40 was the Convair XP5Y-1 patrol aircraft prototype. As flying boat patrol aircraft became redundant, the US Navy changed the role of the aircraft from Anti-Submarine Warfare to Transport. Modifications to the XP5Y-1 (such as provision of air conditioning and pressurisation) produced the Convair R3Y Tradewind, which was to become the only aircraft using the T40 to actually enter service. These large four-engined flying boats served primarily between NAS Alameda and Hawaii during the mid-1950s, (replacing the Martin Mars flying boats). There were numerous problems with the T40s. One resulted in near disaster in 1956, when an R3Y managed to land with a runaway engine, resulting in a collision with a seawall. This event gave the US Navy one more reason to ground the R3Y, which it did soon after.

The only other aircraft to be produced in any quantity to be powered by the T40 was the Douglas A2D-1 Skyshark. Of the sixteen examples built, the twelve used for evaluation suffered similar problems to the R3Y. Propeller control problems and gearbox failures were among the more common problems.

The T40 was also fitted to the North American A2J-1 Super Savage but the poor performance of the aircraft and continuing difficulties with the engines forced cancellation in favour of the Douglas A3D Skywarrior.

The most notable successes of the T40 were in the field of vertical take-off aircraft, being used to power three different types, the Convair XFY-1 Pogo, Lockheed XFV-1 and the Hiller X-18 tilt-wing research aircraft. Fitted with the more powerful 7,100shp YT40-A-6 the XFY-1 flew the first full flight from vertical take-off to horizontal flight and back to vertical flight for landing, of a fixed wing aircraft, in November 1954. Continuing concerns over propellers and the poor payload and performance precluded further development.

Some flying was carried out with the Hiller X-18 but most research was carried out with the aircraft attached firmly to a force measuring platform, that could be raised hydraulically, to gather data on ground cushion effects.

Limited flying was carried out by the two Republic XF-84H Thunderscreech turboprop fighter aircraft, but the continuing difficulties with the T40 engine, supersonic propeller, not to mention performance completely overshadowed by contemporary rivals led to cancellation of production plans.

Applications

Data from:

 Convair P5Y and R3Y
 Convair XFY Pogo
 Douglas A2D Skyshark
 Hiller X-18
 Lockheed XFV
 North American XA2J Super Savage
 Republic XF-84H Thunderscreech

Variants
Model 500 Company designation for the T40
Model 501 Company designation for the T38 (half a T40, for development of the T40)
Model 501-D Company designation for the T56
Model 503Company designation for the T44
XT40-A-1
XT40-A-2
T40-A-4
XT40-A-5
XT40-A-6
XT40-A-10
YT40-A-14
T40-A-20
T40-A-22
T44 (Model 503), with three power sections; none were built and the project was cancelled.
T54-A-2 Re-designed T40 giving  equivalent. After the initial limited success of the T40 the US Navy sponsored development of a new turboprop about 28% larger than the T40, but this work was soon overtaken by the Allison T56 / Allison 501-D and development was cancelled.
T56 (Model 501-D) Successful development of the T40 / T38 with a single power section.

Specifications (T40-A-6)

See also

References

Further reading

External links

Flight 1950 article
Dual Turbine Produces 5,500 h.p. early article with good illustration showing how two engines are connected to one gear box
"American Turboprops" a 1950 Flight article
"Tradewind Turboprops" a 1955 Flight article

T40
1940s turboshaft engines
1950s turboshaft engines